This is a list of universities in the country Georgia.  For a listing within the U.S. state of Georgia, refer to List of colleges and universities in Georgia (U.S. state).

State universities 
Akaki Tsereteli State University (Kutaisi) 
Akhaltsikhe State Education University 
Batumi Art Teaching University 
Batumi Shota Rustaveli State University
Batumi State Maritime Academy 
Georgian Technical University (Tbilisi) 
Gori State Teaching University 
Ilia State University 
International School of Economics at Tbilisi State University 
Shota Meskhia Zugdidi State University 
Sokhumi State University
Tbilisi Ivane Javakhishvili State University 
Tbilisi State Academy of Arts 
Tbilisi State Medical University 
Tbilisi Vano Sarajishvili State Conservatory 
Telavi Iakob Gogebashvili State University 
Shota Rustaveli University of Theater and Cinema (Tbilisi)

Private universities
Georgian National University SEU - Atmia Ranks it #1, Tbilisi (Tbilisi) 
BAU International University, Batumi (Batumi) 
Agricultural University of Georgia (Tbilisi) 
American University for Humanities Tbilisi Campus
Business and Technology University (Tbilisi)
Caucasus International University (Tbilisi) 
Caucasus University (Tbilisi)
David Aghmashenebeli University of Georgia (Tbilisi) 
David Tvildiani Medical University (Tbilisi)
East European University (Tbilisi)
European University (formerly European Teaching University,Tbilisi)
Free University of Tbilisi 
Georgian American University (Tbilisi) 
Georgian Aviation University (Tbilisi) 
Georgian Institute of Public Affairs (Tbilisi)
Grigol Robakidze University (Tbilisi) 
Guram Tavartkiladze Teaching University (Tbilisi) 
International Black Sea University (Tbilisi) 
Kutaisi University
New Vision University (Tbilisi)
Petre Shotadze Tbilisi Medical Academy (Tbilisi) 
Saint Andrews Georgian University (Tbilisi)
Sukhishvili Teaching University (Gori)
Sulkhan-Saba Orbeliani University
Tbilisi Medical Academy
Tbilisi Medical Institute "Hippocrates"
Tbilisi Teaching University
Tbilisi University "Metekhi"
Teaching University European Academy (Zugdidi)
Teaching University Geomedi (Tbilisi)
Teaching University "Iveria" (Tbilisi) 
 
Teaching University of International Relations of Georgia (Tbilisi)
Teaching University "Rvali" (Rustavi) 
Teaching University SEU (Tbilisi)
The University of Georgia (Tbilisi)
University "Sakartvelo" (Tbilisi)
Alterbridge University (Tbilisi)

Former
 Nersisian School (during the period in the Russian Empire)

Universities
Georgia (country)
Georgia (country)
Georgia
Universities